Kaliningrad State Art Gallery (aka Kaliningrad Art Gallery) is an art gallery in Kaliningrad, Russia, located in Moskovsky Prospect.

The gallery was founded in 1988 and specialises in modern art, especially paintings of the 20th century from Russia and elsewhere. It is also developing as a contemporary art gallery. The collections include more than ten thousand works, including graphics, handicrafts, paintings, and sculptures. The museum hosts up to thirty exhibitions and other art projects each year with Russian and foreign partners.

The gallery is involved with the Russia International Biennial of Graphic Art "Kaliningrad-Konigsberg". The 6th Biennial was international, under patronage of the ARS Baltic Committee.

References

External links
 Kaliningrad State Art Gallery website 
 Kaliningrad State Art Gallery website 

1988 establishments in Russia
Art museums established in 1988
Art museums and galleries in Russia
State Art Gallery
Museums in Kaliningrad Oblast
Contemporary art galleries in Russia
Modern art museums